Tortuguero (or El Tortuguero; from Spanish "place of turtles") may refer to:

Places
 El Tortuguero, a municipality in the South Caribbean Coast Autonomous Region of Nicaragua
 Tortuguero (Maya site), an archaeological site in southernmost Tabasco, Mexico
 Tortuguero Lagoon, a natural reservoir located between the Puerto Rican municipalities of Vega Baja and Manatí
 Tortuguero National Park, a national park in the Limón Province of Costa Rica, which contains
 Tortuguero, Costa Rica, a village on the Northern Caribbean coast of Costa Rica
 Tortuguero Conservation Area, an administrative area managed by SINAC for conservation in Limón Province, Costa Rica
 Tortuguero River, a river which flows into the Caribbean Sea in Limón Province, Costa Rica

Other
 Battle of Tortuguero, the first naval battle of the Dominican War of Independence